The Amicrocentrinae are a subfamily of braconid parasitoid wasps. Members of this subfamily were previously included in the Macrocentrinae.

Description and distribution 
Amicrocentrinae are relatively large yellow or brown non-cyclostome braconids.

This subfamily is found in Madagascar and continental Africa.

Biology 
Some species within Amicrocentrinae are known to be parasitoids of large caterpillars which bore into plant stalks.

References

External links 
 DNA barcodes at BOLD systems

Braconidae
Hymenoptera subfamilies